Genius Loci is a 2020 French animated short film by Adrien Merigeau.

Summary
Renee, a young loner, sees a mythical oneness beneath the urban chaos one night.

Accolades
In 2021, it was nominated for an Academy Award for Best Animated Short Film

References

External links
IMDB
Official trailer
Interview with Adrien Mérigeau

French animated films
2020 films
2020 animated films
2020 short films
2020s French films